The Creation may refer to:
The Creation (Haydn), an oratorio by Joseph Haydn
The Creation (band), a 1960s British rock band
 The Creation (book), a 2006 book in advocacy of conservation, by Edward O. Wilson.

See also
Creation (disambiguation)